46610 Bésixdouze, provisional designation , is a bright background asteroid from the inner regions of the asteroid belt, approximately 2 kilometers in diameter. It was discovered on 15 October 1993, by Japanese amateur astronomers Kin Endate and Kazuro Watanabe at the Kitami Observatory in eastern Hokkaidō, Japan. The asteroid was named after "B-612", home of The Little Prince.

Orbit and classification 

Bésixdouze is a non-family asteroid from the main belt's background population. It orbits the Sun in the inner main-belt at a distance of 1.9–2.7 AU once every 3 years and 5 months (1,249 days; semi-major axis of 2.27 AU). Its orbit has an eccentricity of 0.18 and an inclination of 2° with respect to the ecliptic.

Physical characteristics

Diameter and albedo 

According to the survey carried out by the NEOWISE mission of NASA's Wide-field Infrared Survey Explorer, Bésixdouze measures 2.064 kilometers in diameter and its surface has an albedo of 0.262, which is indicative for a stony composition.

Rotation period 

As of 2018, no rotational lightcurve of Bésixdouze has been obtained from photometric observations. The body's rotation period, poles and shape remain unknown.

Naming 

The name was suggested by F. Hemery and Jiří Grygar as a reference to the French novella The Little Prince. The title character lived on an asteroid named B-612, which is the number 46610 written in hexadecimal notation. Bésixdouze ("B-six-twelve") is one way to pronounce B-612 in French. Like the asteroid in The Little Prince, Bésixdouze was first observed in a single night, several years before its official discovery.

The official naming citation was published by the Minor Planet Center on 20 November 2002. It says:

"The decimal number 46610 translates to the hexadecimal B612, the designation of the fictitious minor planet in de St. Exupéry's 1943 novel Le Petit Prince. B612 was allegedly spotted on a single night in 1909 and reported at a meeting in 1920. The name was suggested independently by F. Hémery and J. Grygar."

See also 
 2578 Saint-Exupéry
 B612 Foundation
 Petit-Prince (moon)

References

External links 
 Asteroid Lightcurve Database (LCDB), query form (info )
 Dictionary of Minor Planet Names, Google books
 Asteroids and comets rotation curves, CdR – Observatoire de Genève, Raoul Behrend
 Discovery Circumstances: Numbered Minor Planets (45001)-(50000) – Minor Planet Center
 
 

046610
Discoveries by Kazuro Watanabe
Discoveries by Kin Endate
Named minor planets
46610 Besixdouze
19931015